Mikhail Fyodorovich Bodrov (in ; 1903 – 1988) was a Soviet diplomat, Ambassador extraordinary and plenipotentiary.

Biography 
Mikhail Bodrov was a member of the All-Union Communist Party (bolsheviks). He graduated from the Moscow Institute of Finance and started diplomatic work in 1946.

Bodrov served as Soviet Union's Ambassador Extraordinary and Plenipotentiary to the following countries of the world:
 Bulgaria (August 6, 1948 to January 27, 1954)
 Israel (January 21, 1958 to October 15, 1964)
 Kuwait (September 24, 1966 to July 9, 1970)

In 1954-1958 he served as Deputy Head of the Ministry of Foreign Affairs of the USSR, in 1965–1966 – as Executive Secretary of the ministry.

During his work in Israel Bodrov took part in the so-called “Orange Deal” (in ), formally known as Agreement #593 (“On the sale of Soviet state property to Israel”), concluded on October 17, 1964. The agreement was signed on the Israeli side by Foreign Minister Golda Meir and Finance Minister Pinchas Sapir. The agreement was nicknamed so, because Israel agreed to pay not in money (of which it had none), but in oranges from Jaffa and textiles.

In March 1963, Mikhail Bodrov wrote to Deputy Foreign Minister Sergei Lapin:

Bodrov met and corresponded with Korney Chukovsky.

He retired in 1970 and died in 1988.

References

1903 births
1988 deaths
Financial University under the Government of the Russian Federation alumni
Recipients of the Order of the Red Banner of Labour
Ambassadors of the Soviet Union to Bulgaria
Ambassadors of the Soviet Union to Israel
Ambassadors of the Soviet Union to Kuwait
Soviet diplomats